The Eclectic Sounds of a City Painted Black and White is the only studio album by American metal band Bless the Fallen. A year after the album's release the band changed their name to The Silence and the Serenity.

Track listing

Personnel
 Michael Fraleigh – lead vocals
 Kyle "Majik" Jackson – guitar, backing vocals
 Kyle Behnken – guitar
 Nick Privitera – bass
 Phil Bartsch – drums

References

2007 debut albums
Metalcore albums by American artists